The 2021 Clemson Tigers men's soccer team represented Clemson University during the 2021 NCAA Division I men's soccer season.  They were led by head coach Mike Noonan, in his twelfth season.  They played their home games at Riggs Field.  This was the team's 61st season playing organized men's college soccer and their 34th playing in the Atlantic Coast Conference.

The Tigers finished the season 16–5–2 overall and 5–3–0 in ACC play to finish in a tie for first in the Atlantic Division.  As the second overall seed in the ACC Tournament, they defeated North Carolina in the Quarterfinals before losing to Duke in the Semifinals.  They received an at large bid to the NCAA Tournament and were awarded the eight overall seed.  After a First Round bye, they defeated Denver in overtime in the Second Round and Kentucky in the Third Round.  In the quarterfinals, they face off against top seed Oregon State, who they defeated on penalties to advance.  Penalties were required again to defeat Notre Dame in the Semifinals.  In the Final Clemson defeated Washington to win their third National Title in program history.

Background

The Tigers' 2020 season was significantly impacted by the COVID-19 pandemic, which curtailed the fall season and caused the NCAA Tournament to be played in Spring 2021. The ACC was one of the only two conferences in men's soccer to play in the fall of 2020.  The ACC also held a mini-season during the spring of 2021.

The Tigers finished the fall season 8–2–1 and 3–2–1 in ACC play to finish in third place in the North Division.  They won the ACC Tournament by defeating Virginia Tech, Virginia and Pittsburgh in the final.  They finished the spring season 4–1–1 and 4–1–1 in ACC play, to finish in first place in the Atlantic Division.  They received the ACC's automatic bid to the NCAA Tournament after defeating Pittsburgh in a game for the bid.  As the first seed in the tournament, they defeated American in the Second Round before losing to Marshall in the Third Round on penalty kicks to end their season.

Player movement

Players leaving

Players arriving 

The Tigers added seven players across two signing days, one in November and one in March.

Squad

Roster

Team management

Source:

Schedule

Source:

|-
!colspan=6 style=""| Exhibition

|-
!colspan=6 style=""| Regular season

|-
!colspan=6 style=""| ACC Tournament

|-
!colspan=6 style=""| NCAA Tournament

Goals Record

Disciplinary Record

Awards and honors

2022 MLS Super Draft

Source:

Rankings

References

2021
2021 Atlantic Coast Conference men's soccer season
American men's college soccer teams 2021 season
2021 in sports in South Carolina
Clemson
2021 Clemson
2021 Clemson